Lianna Gunawan is an Indonesian businesswoman. In 2012 she was awarded the Cartier Women's Initiative Award for the Asia-Pacific region for founding La Spina, a footwear business that designs and produces shoes featuring Indonesian materials.

Biography 
Gunawan was born in Semarang, Indonesia, and studied tourism and hospitality at the University of New South Wales, Australia. She started La Spina as a re-seller of shoes, then moved into designing and producing handmade shoes with a team of craftspeople. Her shoe designs feature handmade Indonesian batik fabrics, local wood and Javanese carving techniques.

In 2012 she was awarded the Cartier Women's Initiative Award for the Asia-Pacific region.

References

21st-century Indonesian businesspeople
Indonesian people of Chinese descent
University of New South Wales alumni
People from Semarang
Living people
Year of birth missing (living people)